Ralph B. Peña is a founding member and the current artistic director of Ma-Yi Theater Company, an Obie Award and Drama Desk winning Asian American theatre group based in New York City.  As a playwright, his works include Flipzoids, Project: Balangiga, This End Up, and Loose Leaf Bindings.  He received an Obie Award for his work on The Romance of Magno Rubio. Recent directing credits include Lloyd Suh's "The Wong Kids in the Secret of the Space Chupacabra Go! (Children's Theater Company, MN, and New York), Michael Lew's Microcrisis, Lloyd Suh's Children of Vonderly, Nicky Paraiso's House/Boy for LaMama ETC, and the Singapore and Dublin Theater Festivals, Nicolas Pichay's "Macho Dancer: A Musical," A. Rey Pamatmat's "House Rules, and Hansol Jung's "Among The Dead."

Ralph was born in Manila, the Philippines, to Alfonso S. Peña, and Josephine D. Bayron.   He spent his younger years in Manila, and California, before moving permanently to the U.S. in 1984.  During his time in the Philippines, Ralph helped found a street performance company called Bodabil, later renamed UP Peryante. The group, led by Chris Millado, used vaudeville as a form of protest theater against the Marcos dictatorship.  
 
His experiences in performing and organizing would serve him well after founding Ma-Yi Theater Company in New York City, in the summer of 1989, along with colleagues from the Philippines. He became Ma-Yi Theater’s Artistic Director in 1996.  Since then, and in partnership with Jorge Z. Ortoll, Ma-Yi’s Executive Director, Ralph has worked to make Ma-Yi Theater Company one of the country’s leading venue for new Asian American Theater. As part of his work with Ma-Yi Theatre, Peña directed the world premiere of Hansol Jung's Among the Dead in 2016.

He resides in New York City.

See also
 Filipinos in the New York City metropolitan region

References

 New York Times Review, "The Wong Kids" 
 Twin Cities Review, "The Wong Kids" 
 TDF Feature by Helen Shaw, 
 New York Times Interview 
 Asian Theater Journal, Savage Stage 
 The Village Voice, Asian Equation 
 MELUS Article, A Hunger For History 

Obie Award recipients
American people of Filipino descent
Living people
Year of birth missing (living people)